Angylocalyx is a genus of flowering plants in the family Fabaceae. 
It contains the following species:
 Angylocalyx boutiqueanus L. Touss.
 Angylocalyx braunii Harms

 Angylocalyx oligophyllus (Baker) Baker f.
 Angylocalyx pynaertii De Wild.

 Angylocalyx schumannianus Taub.
 Angylocalyx talbotii Hutch. & Dalziel

Members of this genus accumulate hydroxypipecolic acids and iminosugars in their leaves.

References

Angylocalyceae
Fabaceae genera
Taxonomy articles created by Polbot